Ernest Maftei (6 March 1920 – 19 October 2006) was a Romanian film actor. He appeared in more than seventy films from 1953 to 2006.

Biography
Born in Prăjești, Bacău County, he attended high school in Bacău, and, at age 17, he joined the youth branch of the Iron Guard. For his militant activities, he was detained in 1938 for 5 months at a correctional facility in Vaslui, and later at prisons in  Galați, Jilava, and Văcărești. In 1944 he graduated the Academy of Music and Dramatic Art of Iași. During the early Communist regime he was arrested and spent more time in prison before being released after the intervention of some Jews he helped.

In December 1989 Maftei took an active role in the Romanian Revolution, while in June 1990 he was severely beaten during a Mineriad in Bucharest. He died in Bucharest in 2006.

Selected filmography

References

External links

 

1920 births
2006 deaths
Romanian male film actors
People from Bacău County
Romanian prisoners and detainees
Members of the Iron Guard
George Enescu National University of Arts alumni
Prisoners and detainees of Romania